Detektiv Braun is a 1914 German silent crime film directed by Rudolf Meinert and starring Alwin Neuß and Friedrich Kühne. It was part of a series of German films featuring Neuß as Arthur Conan Doyle's Sherlock Holmes.

Cast
Alwin Neuß as Sherlock Holmes
Friedrich Kühne as Stapleton

References

External links

Films of the German Empire
German silent feature films
German crime films
Films directed by Rudolf Meinert
Films based on British novels
Sherlock Holmes films
Films set in England
Films set in London
German black-and-white films
1910s crime films
Silent mystery films
Silent thriller films
1910s German films